The Dukes of Torres Novas (in Portuguese & Spanish Duque de Torres Novas) was an aristocratic Portuguese title granted by King Philip II of Portugal, also known as Philip III of Spain, by a royal decree of September 26, 1619, to George of Lencastre, 1st Duke of Torres Novas, who died before his parents, Juliana and Álvaro of Lencastre of Lencastre, 3rd Dukes of Aveiro.

The title of Duke of Torres Novas (originally Marquis of Torres Novas) was subsidiary to the title of Duke of Aveiro, and was used by the House of Aveiro heir during his father's life.

List of the Dukes of Torres Novas
 George of Lencastre, 1st Duke of Torres Novas (1594–1632), also known as 3rd Marquis of Torres Novas died before his mother, Juliana of Lencastre, 3rd Duchess of Aveiro, therefore never became Duke of Aveiro;
 Raimundo of Lencastre, 4th Duke of Aveiro (1620–1666), son of the previous Duke. He was 2nd Duke of Torres Novas, from 1632 to 1636, when he succeeded to his grand mother Juliana of Lencastre, 3rd Duchess of Aveiro.

Family name
The family name associated with the Dukes of Aveiro is Lencastre or Lancastre and Ramos-Sarrico, referring to King John I's wife Philippa of Lancaster, daughter of John of Gaunt, 1st Duke of Lancaster and founder of the House of Lancaster.

Genealogical summary

See also
 Duke of Aveiro
 Marquis of Torres Novas
 List of Portuguese Dukedoms

External links
 Genealogy of the Dukes of Torres Novas in Portuguese

Bibliography
”Nobreza de Portugal e do Brasil" – Vol. III, pages 446/447. Published by Zairol Lda., Lisbon 1989.

Dukedoms of Portugal
 
Portuguese nobility
1619 establishments in Portugal

pt:Duque de Torres Novas